Mostafa Faruque Mohammad (1942-2017) was a Bangladesh Awami League politician and the former member of parliament from Jessore-2.

Early life
Mohammad was born on 21 March 1942 in Krishnanagar, Jhikargachha Upazila, Jessore district, East Bengal, British Raj.

Career
Mohammad was a diplomat in Egypt, India, Myanmar, Russia and Vietnam. In 1979, he worked as Bangladesh's alternative representative to the United Nation Security Council. He was elected to Parliament in 2008 from Jessore-2. He was a member of the Parliamentary Standing Committee on Foreign Affairs Ministry. He was made the minister of information and communication technology on 13 September 2012.

Death
Mohammad died on 4 January 2017.

References

Awami League politicians
People from Jessore District
1942 births
2017 deaths
9th Jatiya Sangsad members